Fusion Drive is a type of hybrid drive technology created by Apple Inc. It combines a hard disk drive with a NAND flash storage (solid-state drive of 24 GB or more) and presents it as a single Core Storage managed logical volume with the space of both drives combined.

The operating system automatically manages the contents of the drive so the most frequently accessed files are stored on the faster flash storage, while infrequently used items move to or stay on the hard drive. For example, if spreadsheet software is used often, the software will be moved to the flash storage for faster user access. In software, this logical volume speeds up performance of the computer by performing both caching for faster writes and auto tiering for faster reads.

Availability 
The Fusion Drive was announced as part of an Apple event held on October 23, 2012, with the first supporting products being two desktops: the iMac and Mac Mini with OS X Mountain Lion released in late 2012. Fusion Drive remains available in subsequent models of these computers, but was not expanded to other Apple devices: the latest MacBook and Mac Pro models use exclusively flash storage, and while this was an optional upgrade for the mid-2012 non-Retina MacBook Pro discontinued by Apple, it will replace the standard hard disk drive instead of complementing it in the fashion of Fusion Drive. As of November 2021, no Mac offers a fusion drive.

Design
Apple's Fusion Drive design incorporates proprietary features with limited documentation. It has been reported that the design of Fusion Drive has been influenced by a research project called Hystor. According to the paper, this hybrid storage system unifies a high-speed SSD and a large-capacity hard drive with several design considerations of which one has been used in the Fusion Drive.

 The SSD and the hard drive are logically merged into a single block device managed by the operating system, which is independent of file systems and requires no changes to applications.
 A portion of SSD space is used as a write-back buffer to absorb incoming write traffic, which hides perceivable latencies and boosts write performance.
 More frequently accessed data is stored on the SSD and the larger, less frequently accessed data stored on the HDD.
 Data movement is based on access patterns: if data has been on the HDD and suddenly becomes frequently accessed, it will usually get moved to the SSD by the program controlling the Fusion Drive. During idle periods, data is adaptively migrated to the most suitable device to provide sustained data processing performance for users.

Several experimental studies have been conducted to speculate about the internal mechanism of Fusion Drive. A number of speculations are available but not completely confirmed.

 Fusion Drive is a block-level solution based on Apple's Core Storage, a logical volume manager managing multiple physical devices. The capacity of a Fusion Drive is confirmed to be the sum of two devices. Fusion Drive is file system agnostic and effective for both HFS Plus and ZFS.
 Part of the SSD space is used as a write buffer for incoming writes. In the stable state, a minimum 4 GB space is reserved for buffering writes. A small spare area is set aside on the SSD for performance consistency.
 Data is promoted to the SSD based on its access frequency. The frequency is detected at the block level  and below file system memory cache. Data migration happens in 128 KB chunks during idle or light I/O periods.
 Operating system and other critical documents are always cached on the SSD. Applications are likely to be handled similarly. A regular file can reside on both devices.

See also 
 bcache, dm-cache, and Flashcache on Linux
 Smart Response Technology — a similar technology from Intel (for desktops)
 Intel Turbo Memory
 ExpressCache — used on a number of Wintel laptops
 Core Storage
 ZFS - A file system using similar technology

References

External links 
 Fusion Drive – Apple Support Knowledge Base article
 How to fix a split Fusion Drive using Terminal – Apple Support Knowledge Base article
 Fusion Drive vs SSD - Geek Dashboard

Computer-related introductions in 2012
Solid-state caching
Hard disk drives
Macintosh computers
Solid-state computer storage